Prerna Bhambri (born 12 September 1992) is an Indian tennis player. Prerna Bhambri holds the record of being the only Indian to have won the All India National Tennis Championship four times in a row; and is a runner's up in 2019. She received 'Award for Excellence in Sports' from the Hon'ble Smt. Pratibha Patil, Former President of India.

Career 

Prerna Bhambri holds the record of being the only Indian to have won the All India National Tennis Championship four times in a row; and is a runner's up in 2019.

She has a world career-high singles ranking of world No. 358, achieved on 20 June 2016. Bhambri has won five singles and three doubles titles on the ITF Circuit.

In December 2019, Prerna won 2 gold medals for India in the South Asian Games. In 2016 as well, she won the silver medal in the women's singles event of the South Asian Games. In 2018, she was the winner in Women's Singles and Women's Doubles at the Delhi Olympic Games.

In January 2012, Bhambri made her debut for the India Fed Cup team.
Playing for India at Fed Cup, Bhambri has a win–loss record of 5–3.

Personal 
Prerna is coached by her brother Prateek Bhambri, who has also been a professional tennis player. He has won the All India National Championship in Singles and Doubles. Bhambri's cousin Yuki Bhambri is a professional on the ATP World Tour, with a career-high world ranking of 83. Bhambri is also the younger cousin of Ankita Bhambri and Sanaa Bhambri, who are both retired players. Prerna graduated with an MBA from Jamia Millia Islamia, New Delhi. She is married to Ayush Tandon, who is a Chartered Accountant.

Achievements

Winner of various tournaments in categories i.e. National Series, Championship Series, and Talent Series.

ITF finals

Singles (5–5)

Doubles (3–5)

Fed Cup participation

Singles

Doubles

References

External links
 
 
 

1992 births
Living people
Indian female tennis players
Sportswomen from Delhi
Racket sportspeople from Delhi
21st-century Indian women
21st-century Indian people
South Asian Games gold medalists for India
South Asian Games silver medalists for India
South Asian Games medalists in tennis